Vanmala is a Bollywood film. It was released in 1941. It was directed by Mohan Sinha and had Maya Banerji, Pravin Kumar and Neela in the lead roles.

References

External links
 

1941 films
1940s Hindi-language films
Indian black-and-white films